Eburodacrys inaequalis is a species of beetle in the family Cerambycidae. It was described by Galileo and Martins in 2009.

References

Eburodacrys
Beetles described in 2009